Gulwal is a branch of the Suleiman Khel subgroup of the Pashtun people. They are Sunni Muslims who live in western Afghanistan, South Waziristan Zarmelan, and in Punjab, India and have subbranches, such as Shahbuzar, Mamrez Khan Shahbuzarg, kalakhel, gadami malak kalakhel Pachak, Azikkhel, and Ashiqkhel. They are not influenced by modernisation and their literacy rate is very low, but is increasing. The group also has its own unique customs and culture. 

Ghilji Pashtun tribes
Pashto-language surnames
Pakistani names